Ryokichi Sakai (1897 – 10 July 1952) was a Japanese painter. His work was part of the painting event in the art competition at the 1932 Summer Olympics.

References

1897 births
1952 deaths
20th-century Japanese painters
Japanese painters
Olympic competitors in art competitions
People from Osaka